COART (Coupled Ocean-Atmospheric Radiative Transfer code) - COART is established on the Coupled DIScrete Ordinate Radiative Transfer (Coupled DISORT or CDISORT) code, developed from DISORT. It is designed to simulate radiance (including water-leaving radiance) and irradiance (flux) at any levels in the atmosphere and ocean consistently.

See also
List of atmospheric radiative transfer codes
Atmospheric radiative transfer codes

References

Jin, Z., T.P. Charlock, K. Rutledge, K. Stamnes, and Y. Wang, An analytical solution of radiative transfer in the coupled atmosphere-ocean system with rough surface. Appl. Opt., 45, 7443-7455, 2006.

Jin, Z., and K. Stamnes, Radiative transfer in nonuniformly refracting layered media: atmosphere-ocean system, Appl. Opt., 33, 431-442, 1994.

External links
More information on COART
 COART online: https://clouds.larc.nasa.gov/jin/coart.html
 Ocean Albedo Look-up-table generated by COART: https://drive.google.com/drive/folders/1bVUcTBiZ1B7KhcnYeJiz-zFmpzGtrele?usp=sharing

Atmospheric radiative transfer codes